The 15 boroughs of Oslo were created on 1 January 2004. They each have an elected local council with limited responsibilities. 

In addition is Marka (1610 residents), that is administered by several boroughs; and Sentrum (1471 residents, 1.8 km2) that is partially administered by St. Hanshaugen, and in part directly by the city council. As of 1 January 2020, Oslo had 693,494 residents, of which 2386 were not allocated to a borough.

Former borough structure

Borough structure 1973–88 

From 1973 to 30 June 1988, Oslo had 40 boroughs. Some existed only on paper, since they were to be constituted only when the areas were built.

 Borough 1: Ruseløkka, Skillebekk, Frogner
 Borough 2: Homansbyen, Uranienborg, Majorstua, parts of Fagerborg
 Borough 3: St. Hanshaugen, Gamle Aker, parts of Ila and Fagerborg
 Borough 4: Marienlyst, Ullevål, Lindern, parts of Fagerborg
 Borough 5: Bjølsen, Sagene, parts of Ila
 Borough 6: Sandaker, Åsen, Torshov
 Borough 7: Grünerløkka, Møllergata
 Borough 8: Sinsen, Rodeløkka, parts of Tøyen
 Borough 9: Grønland, Gamlebyen, Kampen, Vålerenga, parts of Tøyen
 Borough 10: Ekeberg, Holtet, Bekkelaget
 Borough 11: Nordstrand
 Borough 12–13–14: Holmlia, Hauketo, Rudene
 Borough 15: Lambertseter
 Borough 16–17: Banderud, Skullerud, Rustad, Bøler, Ulsrud, Tveteråsen
 Borough 18: Ryen, Manglerud, Abildsø
 Borough 19: Skøyen, Oppsal, parts of Trasop
 Borough 20: Etterstad, Helsfyr, Teisen
 Borough 21–22: Tveita, Hellerud, Haugerud, Trosterud, parts of Trasop
 Borough 23 was to take parts of boroughs 20, 24 and 31
 Borough 24–25: Lindeberg, Furuset, Ellingsrud, Haugenstua, Høybråten, Tangerud
 Borough 26: Rommen, Fossum, Stovner
 Borough 27: Romsås
 Borough 28: Rødtvet, Ammerud, parts of Grorud
 Borough 29: Kalbakken, Flaen, parts of Grorud
 Borough 30: Linderud, Veitvet, Sletteløkka
 Borough 31: Løren, Risløkka, Økern
 Borough 32: Lofthus, Årvoll, Tonsenhagen
 Borough 33: Nydalen, Grefsen, Kjelsås
 Borough 34: Tåsen, Korsvoll, Kringsjå
 Borough 35: Vinderen, Ris, Slemdal, Holmenkollen
 Borough 36: Røa, Hovseter, Voksen
 Borough 37: Ullernåsen, Lysaker, Bestum
 Borough 38: Huseby, Smestad, Skøyen
 Borough 39: Bygdøy
 Borough 40: Marka, the islands

Borough structure 1988–2004 

From 1985 to 1988, the boroughs of Stovner, Røa, Gamle Oslo and Søndre Nordstrand were trials for the new system. 
From 1 July 1988 to 31 December 2003, Oslo had 25 boroughs:

 Borough 1: Bygdøy–Frogner
 Borough 2: Uranienborg–Majorstuen
 Borough 3: St.Hanshaugen–Ullevål
 Borough 4: Sagene–Torshov
 Borough 5: Grünerløkka–Sofienberg
 Borough 6: Gamle Oslo
 Borough 7: Ekeberg–Bekkelaget
 Borough 8: Nordstrand
 Borough 9: Søndre Nordstrand
 Borough 10: Lambertseter
 Borough 11: Bøler
 Borough 12: Manglerud
 Borough 13: Østensjø
 Borough 14: Helsfyr–Sinsen
 Borough 15: Hellerud
 Borough 16: Furuset
 Borough 17: Stovner
 Borough 18: Romsås
 Borough 19: Grorud
 Borough 20: Bjerke
 Borough 21: Grefsen–Kjelsås
 Borough 22: Sogn
 Borough 23: Vinderen
 Borough 24: Røa
 Borough 25: Ullern

In addition Sentrum and Marka.

References

 
Norway
Lists of populated places in Norway